Quebec humour is a vast cultural sector whose promotion and development are in part ensured by the Association des professionnels de l'industrie de l'humour (APIH).

The École nationale de l'humour, located in Montreal, is an institution that trains Quebec comedians.

The Gala Les Olivier rewards talented comedians.

Comedy festivals
Quebec hosts many comedy festivals, including:
Just for Laughs
ComediHa! Fest-Québec
Grand Montréal Comique
Zoofest
Festival d'humour d'Alma
Festival d'Humour de l'Abitibi-Témiscamingue
Festival d'Humour de Gatineau
Festival de la Blague de Drummondville
Festival MiniFest

Features
Quebec humour has long been expressed through very popular periodicals entirely devoted to the genre, whether through literature, illustration or comics. Quebec's journals have their own cartoonists who publish humouristic comics.

References
This article has been totally or partially translated from the French-language Humour québécois.

See also
List of Quebec comedians
Culture of Quebec
Canadian humour

Culture of Quebec
Canadian comedy